"So Happy" is a song recorded by Tony Moran featuring American vocalist Jason Walker and released as a single in 2016. The track, produced by Moran and co-written with Walker and Chris Willis, is the New York-based producer/DJ/remixer's fourth number one, as well as Walker's third, on Billboard's Dance Club Songs chart, where it reached that summit in its June 4, 2016 issue.

Track listings
iTunes listing [Volume 1]
So Happy (Victor Dinaire & Bissen Video Mix)  4:38  
So Happy (Tony Moran & Deep Influence Mix)  7:26  
So Happy (Sted-E & Hybrid Heights Club Remix)  4:38  
So Happy (Victor Dinaire & Bissen Club Mix)  6:09  
So Happy (Sted-E & Hybrid Heights Dub / Instrumental Remix)  4:38  
So Happy (Moto Blanco Remix)  6:10  
So Happy (Moto Blanco Radio Edit)  3:52  
So Happy (Victor Dinaire & Bissen Radio Mix)  3:37  
So Happy (Moto Blanco Instrumental Remix)  6:10  
So Happy (Albert Cabrera Jeep Hevy Chill Out Re-Mix)  6:42  

iTunes listing [Volume 2]
 So Happy (Todd Terry "In House" Remix) 7:03  
 So Happy (Edson Pride Remix) 7:34  
 So Happy (Nick Bertossi Remix) 6:47  
 So Happy (Twisted Dee Remix) 6:34  
 So Happy (Strobe Extended Club Remix) 5:43  
 So Happy (Giangi Cappai Extended Remix) 6:35  
 So Happy (DJ Head Remix) 5:13  
 So Happy (Strobe Radio Remix) 4:41  
 So Happy (Toy Armada & DJ Grind Club Remix) 6:37  
 So Happy (Tony Moran & Deep Influence Remix) 7:26  
 So Happy (Albert Cabrera Piano Chillout Remix) 3:41  
 So Happy (Toy Armada & DJ Grind Radio Remix) 4:47

References

External links
Official Video at YouTube

2016 songs
2016 singles
Electronic songs
House music songs
Songs written by Tony Moran
Songs written by Chris Willis